Spring Valley station (sometimes referred as the Spring Valley Transit Center) is an intermodal transit station in Spring Valley, New York. It serves Metro-North Railroad and NJ Transit trains as well as buses as the Spring Valley Bus Terminal. The buses that serve the Spring Valley Bus Terminal are Rockland Coaches (provided by Coach USA), Hudson Link, and Transport of Rockland. It is located on Main Street (Route 45),  from Route 59.

History 
During construction of the New York, Lake Erie and Western Railroad, residents of what would later become Spring Valley demanded a station at the site of a farm road crossing. The residents felt that Eleazar Lord had chosen to give preference to the area at Monsey (formerly Kakiat) because he owned  in the area. They wanted access to shipping via the railroad, but the railroad would not promise service, even if the farmers built their own waiting shanty.

The farmers did indeed construct their own station, a  platform with a wooden shanty. The station, which was named Pascac by the railroad, soon became a store run by a local named Henry Iseman. Once passenger service started, Iseman was evicted from the shanty, having to run his shop elsewhere in the area. The name "Spring Valley" was created by Isaac Springstead, a local farmer, who suggested the new name. With the new name change, a station sign was nailed to a nearby tree with the name "Spring Valley".

On October 26, 1983, the $244,500 renovation of the station was dedicated. As part of the renovation the station received new ceilings, a new floor and a ticket booth.

Station layout
The station has one track and one low-level side platform.

Permit parking is operated by Allright Parking and accommodates 207 vehicles.

Bibliography

References

External links

Spring Valley Station (Existing Railroad Stations in New York State)
 Station from Main Street from Google Maps Street View

NJ Transit Rail Operations stations
Railway stations in Rockland County, New York
Former Erie Railroad stations
Railway stations in the United States opened in 1841
1841 establishments in New York (state)